The Chase is a detective novel by author Clive Cussler written in November 2007. It introduces us to the main character, Isaac Bell. Bell is a tall, lean detective who works for the VanDorn Detective Agency.  The villain in this story uses one of the first five 1905 Harley Davidson motorcycles ever built to escape after the robbery and triple murder at the Bisbee National bank in Bisbee, Arizona.

Blurb

April 1950: The rusting hulk of a steam locomotive rises from the deep waters of a Montana lake. Inside is all that remains of three men who died forty-four years before. But it is not the engine or its grisly contents that interest the people watching nearby. It is what is about to come next . . .

1906: For twelve years, the western states of America have been suffering an extraordinary crime spree: a string of bank robberies by a single man who cold-bloodedly murders any and all witnesses and then vanishes without a trace. Fed up by the depredations of the "Butcher Bandit," the U.S. government brings in the best man they can find-a tall, lean, no-nonsense detective named Isaac Bell, who has caught thieves and killers coast to coast.

But Bell has never had a challenge like this one. From Arizona to Colorado to the streets of San Francisco during its calamitous earthquake and fire, he pursues what is quickly becoming clear to him is the sharpest criminal mind he has ever encountered, and the woman who seems to hold the key to the bandit's identity. Using science, deduction, and intuition, Bell repeatedly draws near only to grasp at thin air, but at least he knows his pursuit is having an effect. Because his quarry is getting angry now, and has turned the chase back on him. The hunter has become the hunted. And soon it will take all of Isaac Bell's skills not merely to prevail… but to survive.

See also
Locomobile Company of America

2007 American novels
Novels by Clive Cussler
Fiction set in 1906
Fiction set in 1950
G. P. Putnam's Sons books
1906 San Francisco earthquake